Plebecula giramica is a species of air-breathing land snail, a terrestrial pulmonate gastropod mollusk in the family Geomitridae. 

This species is endemic to Madeira, Portugal. Its natural habitats are temperate forests and temperate grassland. It is threatened by habitat loss.

References

External links
 Lowe, R. T. (1852). Brief diagnostic notices of new Maderan land shells. The Annals and Magazine of Natural History. (2) 9 (50): 112-120; (2) 9 (52): 275-279. London

Molluscs of Madeira